National Airlines Flight 27 was a scheduled passenger flight between Miami, Florida and San Francisco, California with intermediate stops at New Orleans, Louisiana; Houston, Texas; and Las Vegas, Nevada, in the United States.

On November 3, 1973, the aircraft servicing the flight, a McDonnell Douglas DC-10-10 with the tail number N60NA, experienced an uncontained engine failure, causing significant damage to the aircraft. The aircraft later managed to make a safe emergency landing at the Albuquerque International Sunport. One passenger was ejected from the aircraft at cruising altitude, in addition to minor injuries sustained by 24 passengers.

Flight crew
The crew consisted of Captain William R. Broocke (age 54), employed by National Airlines since 1946, who had qualified to fly the DC-10 in 1972 and accumulated 21,853 flight hours in his career with 801 hours on the DC-10; First Officer Edward H. Saunders (33), employed by National Airlines since 1965, with 7,086 flight hours of which 445 hours were on the DC-10; and Flight Engineer Golden W. Hanks (55), employed by National Airlines since 1950, with 17,814 flight hours of which 1,252 flight hours were on the DC-10.

Incident
On November 3, 1973, Flight 27 took off from Houston, Texas bound for Las Vegas International Airport. The aircraft leveled off at 

Smoke was reported to fill the cabin before the fragments of the fan assembly penetrated the fuselage, the No's. 1 and 2 engine nacelles, and the right wing at high speeds, causing a cabin window to dislodge and eject the adjacent passenger from the aircraft. The resultant damage caused decompression of the aircraft cabin and the loss of certain electrical and hydraulic systems.

The flight crew initiated an emergency descent, and the aircraft landed safely at Albuquerque International Sunport 19 minutes after the engine failed. 115 passengers and 12 crew members exited the aircraft by using the evacuation slides. The plane was repaired and was later flown by Pan Am (as Clipper Meteor).

Casualties

Of the 116 passengers on board, 24 people were treated by medical personnel from nearby Kirtland Air Force Base for smoke inhalation, ear problems, and minor abrasions.

One passenger was partially blown into the opening made by the failed cabin window, after it too was struck by engine fragments. He was temporarily retained in that position by his seatbelt. "Efforts to pull the passenger back into the airplane by another passenger were unsuccessful, and the occupant of seat 17H was sucked entirely through the cabin window."

The New Mexico State Police and local organizations searched extensively for the missing passenger, George F. Gardner of Beaumont, Texas, who was blown out of the window. Computer analysis was made of the possible falling trajectories, which narrowed the search pattern. However, the search effort was unsuccessful. A ranch hand later found a pair of sunglasses and a tobacco pipe while working on a ranch near Alamo, New Mexico. He turned over the items to state police, where the family of the missing passenger identified them as belonging to him.

According to one source, "Two years after the incident, construction began on the Very Large Array radio telescope. While building the tracks north of U.S. 60, the VLA track crew made a gruesome discovery by uncovering human remains. The Office of Medical Investigator was contacted and removed the remains to Albuquerque for identification and cause of death. After nearly a year, it was determined the skeletal remains found on the VLA north arm was that of passenger 17H of Flight 27. The cause of death was fairly obvious. The remains were returned to the family in Texas." However, no reports can be found from newspapers in the 1970s of the discovery of skeletal remains of the airline passenger.

Investigation

The National Transportation Safety Board determined the probable cause of this accident was the disintegration of the No. 3 engine fan assembly as a result of an interaction between the fan blade tips and the fan case. According to the NTSB, "the precise reason or reasons for the acceleration and the onset of the destructive vibration could not be determined conclusively", but enough was learned to prevent the occurrence of similar events. The speed of the engine at the time of the accident caused a resonance wave to occur in the fan assembly when the tips of the fan blades began to make contact with the surrounding shroud. The rearward force was not enough.

In addition to this, it was found that between August 8 and September 12, 1973, there had been 15 problems reported about the third engine. The engine had been taken off the aircraft for repairs, and between the time it was replaced and the accident, a further 26 faults had been reported by the pilots. It was found that the bolts that had held the front covering in place, which had failed in the accident, were outside the tolerances laid down. An engineering dispatch was sent out to inspect these engines, and six more discrepancies were found in the National Airlines fleet alone. Therefore, this dispatch was made compulsory for all early DC-10s in order to prevent the issue from occurring again.

The NTSB expressed concern about the cockpit crew conducting an unauthorized experiment on the auto-throttle system. They had been wondering where the system took its engine power readings from and to see if it was the N1 tachometer readout "the flight engineer pulled the three N1 tachometers [circuit breakers]" and then adjusted the autothrottle setting. The cockpit voice recorder proved that the engines altered their power setting when requested, proving to the crew that the system was powered from another source. The crew then manually reset the throttles to the normal cruising power before the flight engineer had closed the tachometer circuit breakers. It was considered whether the crew had accidentally over-speeded the engine when setting power without the tachometers, but there was insufficient evidence to deliver a certain verdict. Nonetheless, "regardless of the cause of the high fan speed at the time of the fan failure, the Safety Board is concerned that the flight crew was, in effect, performing an untested failure analysis on this system. This type of experimentation, without the benefit of training or specific guidelines, should never be performed during passenger flight operations."

See also

 United Airlines Flight 232, a 1989 accident involving a DC-10 which suffered an uncontained engine failure, resulting in 112 fatalities.
United Airlines Flight 328 and United Airlines Flight 1175, other cases of explosive engine failures.
 Aloha Airlines Flight 243, a 1988 incident that involved an explosive decompression of the fuselage with one fatality.
 British Airways Flight 5390, a 1990 incident where a crew member was partially ejected from a window in flight.
 Southwest Airlines  Flight 3472 and 1380, two incidents in 2016 and 2018, respectively, on two similar Boeing 737-700, both with the same engine model, where the number one engine (left side) experienced a contained engine failure that still caused damage elsewhere in the aircraft (the latter resulting in one fatality).
 Delta Air Lines Flight 1288, another uncontained engine failure; the engine exploded during takeoff, killing two.
 Air France Flight 66, a 2017 incident where an engine exploded during cruise with no injuries.
 Qantas Flight 32, a 2010 incident where the #2 engine suffered an uncontained failure with no injuries.

References

External links

 Aviation Safety Network
 Accident summary (doc file)

Accidents and incidents involving the McDonnell Douglas DC-10
1973 in New Mexico
Airliner accidents and incidents involving in-flight depressurization
Airliner accidents and incidents in New Mexico
27
Aviation accidents and incidents in the United States in 1973
November 1973 events in the United States
Airliner accidents and incidents involving uncontained engine failure